Men Will Be Men is an Indian film starring Gaurav Chopra, Rohit Khurana, Zeenal Kamdar, Rajesh Kumar and Rahil Tandon. The film was produced by Red Chillies Entertainment and directed by Gorky.

Cast 
Gaurav Chopra as Jimmy
Zeenal Kamdar as Deepa
Rohit Khurana as Sundar
Rajesh Kumar as Preet
Rahil Tandon as Bobby
Rajesh Khattar as Boss

References

External links 
 
 

Red Chillies Entertainment films
2010s Hindi-language films
2011 films
Films set in Thailand
Red Chillies Idiot Box